Cái

Bin Phere Free Me Ttere is a 2013 Hindi comedy film written and directed by Manoj Sharma. The film stars Arsh Deol, Ashrita Agarwal and Manoj Joshi (actor).

Cast
Arsh Deol
Ashrita Agarwal
Manoj Joshi
Yashpal Sharma
Manoj Pahwa
Himani Shivpuri
Govind Namdeo
Mukesh Tiwari
Sharat Saxena
Atul Parchure
Razzak Khan
Mushtaq Khan

Crew
Manoj Sharma - Director
Tanveer Alam - Associate Director
Manjunath Gadigennavar -1st Asst director

References

External links

2010s Hindi-language films
2013 comedy horror films
2013 films
Indian comedy horror films
Films directed by Manoj Sharma